Taihu County is a county in the southwest of Anhui Province, People's Republic of China, bordering Hubei Province to the west. It is under the jurisdiction of the prefecture-level city of Anqing and contains its westernmost point. The seat of government is located in Jingxi Town.

Taihu is noted for its "Huating Lake" with its mountains and scenic waters. The lake was originally built for flood control and power generation with a dam constructed in the 1960s. Although it was formerly blamed for destroying large areas of farm land, it has evolved into a popular tourism location.

The county has a long history of Zen, an important tributary of Chinese Buddhism.

Administrative divisions
Taihu County has jurisdiction over 10 towns and 5 townships.

Towns
 Jinxi, Xuqiao, Xiaochi, Xincang, Siqian, Tianhua, Niuzhen, Mituo, Beizhong, Baili

Townships
 Chengxi Township, Jiangtang Township, Dashi Township, Yangquan Township, Liufan Township

Climate

References

 
County-level divisions of Anhui
Anqing